Stephen Earl Shifflett (born January 5, 1966) is a former Major League Baseball pitcher who played for one season. He pitched in 34 games for the Kansas City Royals during the 1992 season.

Shifflett attended but did not play baseball at Pleasant Hill High School in Missouri, instead playing American Legion Baseball. He began his college baseball career at Longview Community College before transferring as a third baseman to Central Missouri. He converted to pitching at Central Missouri but, after one year, could not afford to attend the school and transferred back to Longview. After attending a tryout camp, he accepted an offer to play at Emporia State. In the summer of 1989, he signed with the Kansas City Royals and began a professional baseball career.

References

External links

1966 births
Living people
Baseball players from Kansas City, Missouri
Major League Baseball pitchers
Kansas City Royals players
Emporia State Hornets baseball players
Appleton Foxes players
Colorado Springs Sky Sox players
Iowa Cubs players
Memphis Chicks players
Omaha Royals players
Central Missouri Mules baseball players
Junior college baseball players in the United States